Srećno Novo UžiVo (trans. Happy New Live; also a word play, as Srećno Novo Uvo is  Serbian for Happy New Ear, which is the title of Van Gogh's previous live album) is the third live album by Serbian rock band Van Gogh. The album was released in 2007 by Bosnia and Herzegovina record label Hayat Production.

Track listing
All the songs were written by Zvonimir Đukić, except where noted.
"Puls" (Z. Đukić, S. Radivojević) - 4:01
"Spisak razloga" - 4:11
"Kolo" - 3:02
"Za godine tvoje" - 4:23
"Mama" - 4:37
"Opasan ples" (Z. Đukić, S. Habić) - 5:44
"Tanka nit" (Z. Đukić, S. Radivojević) - 3:49
"Neko te ima" (Z. Đukić, G. Milisavljević) - 5:23
"Brod od papira" - 4:41
"Basna" - 4:19
"Da li zna" - 5:23
"Zamisli" (Z. Đukić, S. Radivojević) - 4:47
"Ekstaza" - 3:57
"Zemlja čuda" (Z. Đukić, S. Radivojević, H. Peretti, G. D. Weiss) - 4:10
"Klatno" - 2:53

Personnel
Zvonimir Đukić - guitar, vocals
Dejan Ilić - bass guitar
Srboljub Radivojević - drums

References
Srećno Novo UžiVo at Discogs

External links
Srećno Novo UžiVo at Discogs

2007 live albums
Van Gogh (band) live albums
Hayat Production albums